Diprose is a surname. Notable people with the surname include:

 Graham Diprose, English photographer and author
 Jack Diprose (1905–2002), Australian rules footballer
 Noel Diprose (1922–2006), Australian cricketer
 Rosalyn Diprose, Emeritus Professor of philosophy at University of New South Wales
 Tony Diprose (b. 1972), former English rugby union footballer

See also
 Louth v Diprose, an Australian contract law and equity case

English-language surnames